Molla Kheyl or Molla Kheil may refer to:
 Molla Kheyl-e Lai
 Molla Kheyl-e Purva